Zengwen Dam, also spelled Tsengwen Dam, is a major earthen dam in Dapu Township, Chiayi County, Taiwan on the Zengwen River. It is the third tallest dam in Taiwan, and forms Zengwen Reservoir (曾文水庫), the biggest reservoir in Taiwan by volume. The dam stores water for irrigation of the Chianan Plain, Taiwan's most productive agricultural region, and provides flood control along the Zengwen River which flows through Tainan City. The dam supports a 50 megawatt hydroelectric power station.

History

Chianan irrigation project

The first proposals for the dam were made as early as the 1930s during the Japanese occupation of Taiwan. The Japanese had built the Chianan Irrigation system to increase Taiwan's agricultural output, which was supplied primarily by the Zengwen River. Because the Zengwen River does not cross the area of the Chianan Plain to be irrigated, a tunnel had to be punched through mountains to divert Zengwen water into the Guantian River. Between 1920 and 1930, the Wushantou Dam was built, forming an impoundment of the Guantian River to store  of water for seasonal use. At the time of completion, it was the largest dam in Taiwan.

Initial proposal
Due to Taiwan's highly seasonal rainfall, the Zengwen River contains little water except during the wet season from May to October, during which massive floods occur that exceed the capacity of the diversion tunnel. Out of the average  annual flow of the Zengwen River, only 25 percent of the water could be effectively used. Furthermore, the Zengwen river has a high silt content, which was causing the Wushantou reservoir to quickly lose its capacity. In 1939, Japanese engineer Hada Yoiji proposed the construction of a concrete gravity dam at a place called Lioutengtan, to control the floods and block silt, but these plans were dropped due to the intervention of World War II.

River diversion
Construction finally began at the Lioutengtan site on October 31, 1967. Two tunnels were excavated through the rock underneath the south abutment of the future dam site.

Dam and spillways

After the river had been diverted, the foundation could be excavated down to bedrock and drained. Construction of the dam could not begin until several faults in the bedrock had been stabilized and treated with concrete and grout. Construction of the main embankment using the hydraulic fill method began on October 31, 1970 and continued until April 21, 1973. The dam was constructed using material from the spillway and foundation excavations, as well as the river bed upstream where the reservoir would be formed.

The concrete spillway was constructed to the north (right bank) of the dam and consists of a multi-level open channel controlled by three radial gates. Construction of the spillway was carried out simultaneously with the main dam. The spillway can discharge up to  when all the gates are open. The dam is also equipped with two sluice gates for de-silting operations, and two flood outlet tunnels with  capacity.

The entire project consisting of dam, spillway, and power station was formally completed and dedicated on October 31, 1973, exactly six years after the beginning of construction. The total cost of construction was US$97,373,000.

Power station

The facilities were constructed using the cut and cover method. The  Tongda tunnel was built to allow workers and equipment to access the plant after it had been completed. The power station's single 50,000 kilowatt generator first came online in October 1973. The average annual power generation is 184,900,320 kilowatt hours. Because dam releases are determined by irrigation and domestic water supply needs, power generation is secondary (incidental) and does not always correspond to demand on the grid.

Due to the large elevation difference between Zengwen Dam and the head of Wushantou reservoir, further development of run-of-the-river hydropower plants below the dam may be feasible. An 11,500 kilowatt facility is proposed, which would generate up to 49 million kilowatt hours annually.

Reservoir

On March 2, 1973 with construction on the dam 96 percent complete, the first diversion tunnel was plugged; on April 28, 1973, the second tunnel was blocked, allowing the reservoir to begin storing water. The filling was approximately five months ahead of schedule, enabling water to be stored for the 1973 irrigation season rather than beginning in 1974 as originally planned.

Although the main purpose of the Zengwen reservoir is irrigation, it is also operated for flood control during the typhoon season. If the Central Weather Bureau issues a typhoon warning, and the reservoir level is higher than the flood-control pool, the gates may be opened to drain the extra water ahead of time, to reduce the risk of a sudden uncontrolled overflow that might endanger lives and property downstream.

This makes possible the irrigation of an additional  of land, while improving the reliability of supply for already existing farmland. It also allows for boats to access remote villages in Dapu township, which prior to the dam's construction could only be reached by winding mountain roads.

The Zengwen Reservoir Management Bureau was established on January 1, 1974 to coordinate operations of the dam and reservoir. On January 23, 1998 the bureau was combined with other reservoir administrations in southern Taiwan, to form the Southern Region Water Resources Office.

Watershed and environmental issues
About 77 percent of the watershed is forest, 13 percent is agriculture, 9 percent other uses and less than 1 percent is urbanized. The reservoir has suffered severe siltation (sedimentation) from the watershed, which has caused a large reduction in its capacity.

Siltation has reduced the volume of water available for irrigation and hydropower, as well as reducing the effectiveness of the Zengwen reservoir to control flooding. The siltation rate has greatly increased in recent years, in part due to a sharp increase in the intensity of typhoon rains, as well as a rising frequency of drought. In August 2009, Typhoon Morakot caused massive flooding and mudflows which carried  of sediment into the reservoir, almost instantly wiping out 13 percent of its capacity.

Due to lack of funding, dredging operations in the Zengwen reservoir have been limited, and the effective storage capacity has continued to decrease. However, after Typhoon Morakot the Taiwanese government approved a NT$54 billion project to remove silt and conduct watershed restoration work at Zengwen, Wushantou and Nanhua reservoirs.

The project was constructed from March 2013 to November 2017 and cost NT$4.1 billion. It is expected to remove 1.04 billion tonnes of sediment each year.

Recreation
The Zengwen dam and reservoir are part of the Zengwen Reservoir Scenic Area. The reservoir was first opened to the public in July 1974.

See also

 List of dams and reservoirs in Taiwan
 List of power stations in Taiwan
 Nanhua Dam
 Wushantou Dam
 Electricity sector in Taiwan

References

External links

Current water levels at Taiwan reservoirs (Chinese)

1973 establishments in Taiwan
Dams completed in 1973
Dams in Chiayi County
Earth-filled dams
Hydroelectric power stations in Taiwan